TrønderEnergi is a power company based in the municipality Trondheim, Norway that operates hydroelectric power plants and wind farms, as well as the power grid in parts of the county Sør-Trøndelag. The grid encompasses eleven municipalities, and current grid to 120.000 customers. Total electricity production is 3.0 TWh.

It also owns the Ugandan Tronder Power Ltd., which in 2008 built and since then operated Bugoye Power Station in southwestern Uganda. This with financial aid from the Norwegian stateowned equity company and Bugoye co-owner Norfund.

The company is entirely owned by 22 municipalities as well as Nordmøre Energiverk, though organized as a limited company. The owners are the municipalities of Agdenes (2.32%), Bjugn (5.69%), Frøya (2.75%), Hemne (4.88%), Hitra (2.54%), Holtålen (1.49%), Malvik (2.71%), Melhus (14.66%), Midtre Gauldal (3.51%), Nordmøre Energiverk (3.99%), Oppdal (3.25%), Orkdal (11.70%), Osen (1.02%), Rissa (8.87%), Roan (1.05%),  Selbu (1.39%), Skaun (4.98%), Snillfjord (1.34%), TrønderEnergi (2.63%), Ørland (2.79%), Åfjord (4.15%), Trondheim (10.00%), Klæbu (0,10%).

History
The company was founded in 1950 as an inter-municipal agency named Sør-Trøndelag Elektrisitetsverk, later changing its name to Sør-Trøndelag Kraftselskap and finally to the limited company TrønderEnergi AS. In 2001 it merged with Melhus Energi. The same year TrønderEnergi bought 49% of the power company Nordmøre Energiverk. In 2010 it merged with Trondheim Energi Nett AS.

Power plants
 Bessakerfjellet windfarm
 Eidsfoss power plant
 Frøya windfarm
 Håen power plant
 Lofoss power plant
 Mørre power plant
 Nunelva power plant
 Sama power plant
 Simsfossen power plant
 Skjærlivatn power plant
 Sokna power plant
 Svartelva power plant
 Søa power plant
 Valsneset windfarm
 Vik power plant

Electric power companies of Norway
Companies owned by municipalities of Norway
Companies based in Trondheim
Energy companies established in 1950
1950 establishments in Norway